Cerithium eburneum is a species of sea snail, a marine gastropod mollusk in the family Cerithiidae.

Distribution
The distribution of Cerithium eburneum includes the Western Central Atlantic.
 North America
 USA

Description 
The maximum recorded shell length is 43 mm.

Habitat 
Minimum recorded depth is 0 m. Maximum recorded depth is 18 m.

References

External links

Cerithiidae
Gastropods described in 1792